Ronald Joseph Livingston (born June 5, 1967) is an American actor. He is best known for playing Peter Gibbons in the 1999 film Office Space and Captain Lewis Nixon III in the 2001 miniseries Band of Brothers.
Livingston's other roles include the films Swingers (1996), Adaptation (2002), The Conjuring (2013); and the television series Loudermilk, and Boardwalk Empire, on which he appeared in the fourth season.

Early life
Livingston was born in Cedar Rapids, Iowa, to Kurt Livingston, an aerospace/electronics engineer, and Linda (née Rinas), a Lutheran pastor. His younger brother, John, is also an actor; while his sister, Jennifer Livingston, and brother-in-law, Mike Thompson, are TV news personalities at WKBT-DT in La Crosse, Wisconsin. 

Livingston attended Yale University, where he sang with The Whiffenpoofs and graduated in 1989, together with Anderson Cooper. 

Livingston first acted at Theatre Cedar Rapids after being introduced to the group during a school job shadowing. Livingston moved to Chicago and became involved in the local theater scene.

Career
Livingston's first film role was in 1992, in Dolly Parton's Straight Talk. He moved to Los Angeles and was cast in supporting roles in Some Folks Call it a Sling Blade and The Low Life. Livingston landed his first role in a major film in 1996's Swingers. He starred as the male lead, Peter Gibbons, in the comedy cult classic Office Space, which co-starred Jennifer Aniston and was written and directed by Mike Judge. He also appeared in HBO's miniseries Band of Brothers as Captain Lewis Nixon III opposite Donnie Wahlberg and Damian Lewis. Livingston widened his variety of roles when he played a Hollywood agent in Adaptation (2002), a weaselly Ivy League upstart opposite Alec Baldwin's casino boss in The Cooler (2003) and teachers in Winter Solstice and Pretty Persuasion (both 2005). He also appeared as sardonic writer Jack Berger, Carrie's short-term boyfriend in the fifth and sixth seasons of Sex and the City. He guest-starred in the episode "TB or Not TB" of House. In 2006, he starred as FBI negotiator Matt Flannery in the Fox series Standoff, co-starring Rosemarie DeWitt, and he was an advertising spokesman for Sprint Nextel.

In summer 2007, Livingston appeared on the off-Broadway stage in the world premiere of Neil LaBute's In a Dark Dark House, produced by MCC Theater, with Frederick Weller and Louisa Krause. The show ran May–July at the Lucille Lortel Theatre in New York City. In November 2007, the indie film Holly told the story of a Vietnamese girl trafficked into the sex trade in Cambodia. Livingston starred as Patrick, a shady card shark who becomes determined to save Holly from her ill-destined fate.

In 2009, he portrayed flight engineer Maddux Donner in the series Defying Gravity, which was cancelled after its first season.

In 2010, Livingston co-starred in the Jay Roach comedy Dinner for Schmucks.  On February 26, 2013, Entertainment Weekly confirmed that he would be joining the cast of HBO's Boardwalk Empire for the fourth season.

In 2013, Livingston co-starred in the indie comedy Drinking Buddies alongside Olivia Wilde, Jake Johnson and Anna Kendrick. Drinking Buddies received positive reviews from critics. Rotten Tomatoes gives the film a score of 82% based on 97 reviews.

Livingston starred in the Peter Farrelly–produced comedy television series Loudermilk on the Audience network.  Livingston played the title role of Sam Loudermilk, a former music critic and recovering alcoholic who works as a substance abuse counselor and support group leader, and who regularly doles out clever but acid-tongued critiques to his clients, his friends, and random people he encounters. The show premiered in October 2017 and was renewed in April 2018 for a second season that premiered in October 2018. In December 2018, Audience renewed the series for a third season. After Audience ceased operations, the third season premiered on Amazon Prime Video in 2020–21.

Livingston also stars in the ABC drama A Million Little Things as Jon Dixon, whose suicide causes his group of friends to evaluate their own lives.

Personal life
Livingston and his Standoff co-star Rosemarie DeWitt began a relationship after meeting on the show. After dating for three years, they were married on November 2, 2009, in San Francisco. He was previously engaged to actress Lisa Sheridan.

In May 2013, Livingston and his wife announced they had adopted an infant girl born the previous month. In December 2016, the couple announced they had adopted another child, a girl, who was born the previous year.

Filmography

Film

Television

References

External links

 
 

1967 births
20th-century American male actors
21st-century American male actors
American male film actors
American male stage actors
American male television actors
Living people
Male actors from Iowa
Actors from Cedar Rapids, Iowa
People from Marion, Iowa
Yale University alumni
Male actors from Chicago